, also known as , was an empress consort of Emperor Toba of Japan and mother of Emperor Konoe.

Life

Early years 
Born in 1117, Nariko grew up with her father Nagazane's doting affection. According to the Imakagami, he commented that he could not bring himself to marry her to an ordinary person. Nariko's maternal uncle  recorded in his diary that even when Nagazane was on his deathbed, he shed tears and said that he could not forget his dear girl for even a moment.

Nagazane was favored in the court because his grandmother  acted as wetnurse to the future Emperor Shirakawa, and during Shirakawa's cloistered rule, Nagazane served as his attendant. Three months later, Toba made Narihito crown prince and thus successor to Emperor Sutoku. In 1140, she adopted Emperor Sutoku's first son .

Mother to the Emperor 
In late 1141, Toba pressed Sutoku to abdicate the throne and replaced him with his and Nariko's son Narihito, who took the throne as Emperor Konoe. Power began to concentrate around her as Toba's most favored retainers, including her cousin , her relatives in the Murakami Genji, and the courtiers of the Nakamikado-ryū of the Fujiwara Hokke gathered around her. In early 1142, Toba's other wife Fujiwara no Tamako was forced to become a nun for attempting to curse Nariko, and her political position solidified further. In 1149, Nariko was bestowed the title Bifukumon-in.

In 1148, Nariko took in her cousin 's daughter Fujiwara no Shimeko as her adopted daughter. This came immediately after Toba consented to allow Fujiwara no Yorinaga's adopted daughter Fujiwara no Tashi to marry Emperor Konoe, and Nariko may have intended to marry Shimeko to Konoe from the first. When Konoe came of age in 1150, Tashi immediately entered his court, but Shimeko followed two months later. As Shimeko was also an adopted daughter of the regent Fujiwara no Tadamichi, Tadamichi reported to Toba that a woman not of the regent family could not become empress. Although Tadamichi was also Yorinaga's adoptive father, he had recently had his own son Konoe Motozane, and allied with Nariko in an effort to let his own biological descendants succeed him. Tashi became kōgō, and Shimeko chūgū.

As Tashi was of the same family as Tamako, and Shimeko was her own adopted daughter, Nariko showed more of an affinity towards Shimeko and hoped that she would bear a child first. In 1152, Nariko directed the affixation of Shimeko's maternity belt, and when Shimeko went into confinement to give birth two months later, Nariko constructed five human-sized buddha statues and prayed for safe delivery. However, Shimeko did not give birth on schedule, and although monks prayed for her every day, it was clear that autumn that the pregnancy had failed. Three months later, Shimeko returned to the palace. In the end, her pregnancy may have been a phantom pregnancy, spurred on by the hopes and anticipation of those around her. The disappointed Nariko allied with Tadamichi, moving to produce a favorable outcome in the succession.

After Emperor Konoe 
In 1155, the physically weak Emperor Konoe died. Two of Nariko's adopted sons were now in the running as possible successors: Emperor Sutoku's first son Prince Shigehito and the Sutoku's younger brother Prince Masahito, Prince Morihito. As it had already been decided that the latter was to become a monk at Ninna-ji, it was assumed that Shigehito would become emperor. However, multiple players were opposed to this. Nariko was worried that a cloistered rule by Sutoku would constrain her power. Fujiwara no Michinori was the husband of Prince Masahito's wetnurse and looking to expand his own power. Ultimately, the decision was made to install the 29-year-old Prince Masahito as emperor immediately as Emperor Go-Shirakawa, without making him crown prince, until Prince Morihito could take the throne. Shortly thereafter Morihito returned from Ninna-ji and received Nariko's complete support. He was made crown prince, came of age three months later, and married Nariko's daughter Princess Yoshiko. At the same time, there was a rumor that Emperor Konoe had died of a curse. Nariko and Tadamichi slandered Tadazane and Yorinaga to Toba, after which Yorinaga lost his position as nairan and his power in the court.

Emperor Sutoku, dissatisfied at his line's removal from the succession, allied with Tadazane and Yorinaga, launching the Hōgen Rebellion immediately after Toba's death in 1156. Nariko had at this point already become a nun, but she showed strategic ability in the conflict. Toba had left Taira no Kiyomori and his brothers out of his will because Kiyomori's stepmother was Prince Shigehito's wetnurse, but by inviting them to help Go-Shirakawa's side in spite of this, Nariko helped him to win the war.

After the rebellion, Fujiwara no Michinori took control of the political situation. Nariko had long wished for her adopted son Prince Morihito's enthronement, and after a conference between her and Michinori in 1158 Prince Morihito ascended to the throne as Emperor Nijō. Unfortunately, this development led to the formation and opposition of sides centering on Michinori, Nijō, and Go-Shirakawa, which ultimately erupted in the Heiji Rebellion.

After this second rebellion, on December 22, 1160, Nariko died in her  palace at the age of 44. According to her wishes, her remains were buried at Mount Kōya. At the time, women were not permitted to enter Mount Kōya, and so this caused something of a stir there.

Issue 
 1135–1148 Imperial Princess Eishi/Toshiko (叡子内親王)
 1137–1211 Imperial Princess Akiko (暲子内親王)
 1139–1155 Imperial Prince Narihito (体仁親王), later Emperor Konoe
 1141–1176 Imperial Princess Yoshiko/Shushi (姝子内親王), empress (chūgū to Emperor Nijō)

Notes

Sources 

Fujiwara clan
Japanese empresses
Japanese Buddhist nuns
12th-century Buddhist nuns
1117 births
1160 deaths